Charles William "Carl" Schuette (April 4, 1922 – 1975) was an American football player and coach.  He played linebacker in the All-America Football Conference (AAFC) and National Football League (NFL) for the Buffalo Bills and Green Bay Packers from 1948 to 1951. He played at the college football at Marquette University.

Biography
Schuette was on April 4, 1922 in Sheboygan, Wisconsin.  He later coached football at Marquette, Brown University, Colgate University, the United States Naval Academy, Harvard University, and with the Saskatchewan Roughriders and Hamilton Tiger-Cats of the Canadian Football League (CFL).

References

1922 births
1975 deaths
American football linebackers
Buffalo Bills (AAFC) players
Green Bay Packers players
Brown Bears football coaches
Colgate Raiders football coaches
Hamilton Tiger-Cats coaches
Harvard Crimson football coaches
Marquette Golden Avalanche football players
Marquette Golden Avalanche football coaches
Navy Midshipmen football coaches
Saskatchewan Roughriders coaches
Sportspeople from Sheboygan, Wisconsin
Players of American football from Wisconsin